Dylan Macleod is a Canadian cinematographer. He won a Gemini Award for Best Photography in a Variety or Performing Arts Program or Series at the 25th Gemini Awards in 2010 for the television film Nureyev, a Canadian Screen Award for Best Photography in a Variety or Performing Arts or Sketch Comedy Program at the 1st Canadian Screen Awards for Love Lies Bleeding. and the Borsos Competition award for best cinematography in a Canadian film at the 2015 Whistler Film Festival, for his work on Ingrid Veninger's 2015 film He Hated Pigeons.

Filmography

Films
 Love Come Down (2001)
 Evelyn: The Cutest Evil Dead Girl (2002)
 Civic Duty (2006)
 Ground Rules (2009)
 He Hated Pigeons (2015)
 Trench 11 (2017)

Television
 Nureyev (2009)
 Bad Blood (2018)
 Cardinal (2018–19)
 The Boys (2019)

References

External links

Year of birth missing (living people)
Living people
Canadian cinematographers
Place of birth missing (living people)
Canadian Screen Award winners